Rimba II Secondary School (abbreviated as SMRII) is a government secondary school in Rimba area on the outskirts of Bandar Seri Begawan, the capital of Brunei.

Location 
The school is technically located in Area 1 of Rimba National Housing Scheme which is a village subdivision under Gadong 'A' in Brunei-Muara District. Rimba National Housing Scheme is a public housing estate on the northern outskirts of the capital Bandar Seri Begawan.

See also 
 List of secondary schools in Brunei

References 

Secondary schools in Brunei
Cambridge schools in Brunei